Ali Hassan (born May 10, 1996), better known online as SypherPK, is an American YouTuber and Twitch streamer known for his gaming streams and videos centering around the game Fortnite. As of November 2022, he has the 19th most followed channel on the Twitch platform. He has mentioned being managed by his wife.

Career 
In 2015, SypherPK began gaming full-time. In November 2018, he failed to qualify in the "Fortnite Winter Royale" finals. In July 2020, he received backlash after TikTok user JGshotTV and viewer of SypherPK revealed that he was banned from the latter's chat. SypherPK denied any wrongdoing in a response to the situation on Twitter. In October 2020, he and fellow Twitch streamer KittyPlays partnered with online shopping service Klarna to launch a campaign titled "Playing For Keeps". In November 2020, he signed an exclusive streaming deal with the streaming platform Twitch. In February 2021, Fortnite unveiled its collaboration with SypherPK in the form of a locker bundle. In June 2022, he partnered with Japanese automobile company Honda as part of an event titled "Hondaverse" in the game Fortnite. In September 2022, a cosmetic outfit in  Fortnite was released with his likeness.

Awards and nominations

References

External links 
 

Living people
1996 births
2011 establishments in the United States
21st-century American people
American YouTubers
American video bloggers
English-language YouTube channels
Gaming-related YouTube channels
Gaming YouTubers
Twitch (service) streamers
YouTube channels launched in 2011